House of Suns is a 2008 science fiction novel by Welsh author Alastair Reynolds.

Connections to previous works
The novel is set in the same fictional setting as Reynolds' novella "Thousandth Night", which appears in the anthology One Million A.D.. Reynolds has stated on his blog that the longer work "does not attempt slavish consistency" with "Thousandth Night". (A number of characters killed in the novella make an appearance in the novel.) The novel was shortlisted for the 2009 Arthur C. Clarke Award.

Setting
Approximately six million years in the future, humanity has spread throughout the Milky Way galaxy, which appears devoid of any other organic sentient life. The galaxy is populated by numerous civilizations of humans and posthumans of widely varying levels of development. A civilization of sentient robots known as the Machine People coexists peacefully with humanity. Technologies of the era include anti-gravity, inertial damping, force fields, stellar engineering, and stasis fields. Also of note is the "Absence"—the mysterious disappearance of the Andromeda Galaxy.

Large-scale human civilizations almost invariably seem to collapse and disappear within a few millennia (a phenomenon referred to as "turnover"), the limits of sub-lightspeed travel making it too difficult to hold interstellar empires together. Consequently, the most powerful entities in the galaxy are the "Lines"—familial organizations made of cloned "shatterlings". The Lines do not inhabit planets, but instead travel through space, holding reunions after they have performed a "circuit" of the galaxy; something that takes about 200,000 years.

House of Suns concerns the Gentian Line, also known as the House of Flowers, composed of Abigail Gentian and her 999 clones (or "shatterlings"), male and female: exactly which of the 1,000 shatterlings is the original Abigail Gentian is unknown. The clones and Abigail travel the Milky Way Galaxy, helping young civilizations, collecting knowledge, and experiencing what the universe has to offer. Members of the Gentian Line are named after flowering plants.

Synopsis
The novel is divided into eight parts, with the first chapter of each part taking the form of a narrative flashback to Abigail Gentian’s early life (six million years earlier, in  the 31st century), before the cloning and the creation of the Gentian Line. Each subsequent chapter is narrated from the first-person perspective of two shatterlings named Campion and Purslane, alternating between them each chapter. Campion and Purslane are in a relationship, which is frowned upon, even punishable, by the Line.

The primary storyline begins as Campion and Purslane are roughly fifty years late to the 32nd Gentian reunion. They take a detour to contact a posthuman known as ‘Ateshga’ in hopes of getting a replacement ship for Campion because his is getting old (several million years old). After being tricked by Ateshga, Campion and Purslane manage to turn the tables on him and leave his planet with a being he had been keeping captive, a golden robot called Hesperus. Hesperus is a member of the "Machine People", an advanced civilization of robots, and supposedly the only non-human sentient society in existence. The two shatterlings hope that the rescue of Hesperus will let them off the hook for their lateness, as returning him to his people (who will be at the reunion as guests of other shatterlings) will put the Gentian Line on good terms with the Machine People.

However, before reaching the reunion world, Campion and Purslane encounter an emergency distress signal from Fescue, another Gentian shatterling. There was a vicious attack on the reunion world; an ambush in which the majority of the Gentian Line was wiped out. The identity of the responsible party is unknown, but the attackers used the supposedly long-vanished 'Homunculus' weapons – monstrous spacetime-bending weapons that were created ages ago, but were ordered to be destroyed by another Line.

Despite Fescue's warning, Campion and Purslane approach the reunion system to look for survivors. They manage to find the remains of a ship with several Gentian members still alive, and rescue them and the four enemy prisoners they had captured. Hesperus, however, is gravely injured in the process by remaining ambushers. The group escapes and make their way to the Gentian backup meeting planet, Neume, in the hope of re-grouping with any other Gentians who may have survived the ambush.

Upon reaching Neume, Campion, Purslane and the other shatterlings they rescued are greeted by the few Gentian survivors of the ambush (numbering only in the forties, compared to the hundreds that existed before the ambush). They also meet two members of the Machine People: Cadence and Cascade, guests of another shatterling. During the next few days, the interrogation of the prisoners commences. Another Gentian, Cyphel, is mysteriously murdered, which fuels the Line’s concerns that there is a traitor among them.

As a way of punishing Campion for transgressions against the Line, Purslane is made to give up her ship, the Silver Wings of Morning (one of the fastest and most powerful in the Line) to Cadence and Cascade, ostensibly so they can return to the Machine People with news of the ambush, in a bid to gain the Line some assistance.

Hesperus, still critically wounded following the rescue of the survivors, is taken to the Neumean "Spirit of the Air", an ancient posthuman machine-intelligence, in the hopes that it will fix him. The Spirit takes Hesperus away and returns him some time later, though apparently still not functioning. 
The robots Cadence and Cascade make preparations to leave on Purslane's ship. They agree to take him aboard and return him to their people, who they promise may be able to help Hesperus. Purslane accompanies them to her ship, where she must be physically present to give the ship order to transfer control over to the robots. On their way to the bridge, Hesperus suddenly springs to life, grabbing Purslane and hiding her while Cadence and Cascade are whisked along to the bridge. Hersperus quickly explains that Cadence and Cascade are actually planning on hijacking the ship. Bewildered by this sudden change of events, Purslane delays in acting, not sure if she should trust Hesperus, before deciding to ask the ship to detain and eject the robots in the bridge. By then, though, it is too late. Cadence and Cascade hack into the ship's computer, taking it over, and take off from Neume with Hesperus and Purslane still aboard. Campion and several other shatterlings immediately launch a pursuit.

Together Hesperus and Purslane find a hideout in a smaller ship in the hold of the Silver Wings of Morning. Using information gained from the other two robots and his own memories, Hesperus (who is now an amalgamation of both Hesperus and the Spirit of the Air) has pieced together what is going on: Cadence and Cascade have discovered that the Line was involved in the accidental extermination of a forgotten earlier race of machine people, dubbed the "First Machines". The Commonality (a confederation of the various Lines), horrified and ashamed of this pointless genocide, erased all knowledge of the event from historical records and their own memories. Unfortunately, Campion, in a previous circuit, unwittingly uncovered information pertaining to the extermination. Hesperus believes that the ambush at the reunion was seeking to destroy this evidence before it could spread, carried out by a shadow Line known as the "House of Suns", tasked with maintaining the conspiracy. Cadence and Cascade, on the other hand, are racing for a wormhole which leads to the Andromeda Galaxy, to where the few survivors of the First Machines are revealed to have retreated. They plan to release the First Machines back into the Milky Way, thus effecting a revenge against the Commonality for the genocide.

As Campion and the shatterlings are pursuing Purslane's hijacked ship, transmissions from Neume confirm that a shatterling within their midst, Galingale, is the traitor and a secret member of the House of Suns. The shatterlings open fire on both Galingale's and Purslane's ships, and while they manage to capture Galingale, they are unable to stop Purslane's ship.

Unable to get within weapons range, Campion pursues Purslane’s ship for sixty thousand light years, during which time he and Purslane, on their separate ships, are suspended in "abeyance", a form of temporal slowdown or stasis. Despite efforts to stop the hijacked ship from reaching the concealed wormhole by local civilisations, the robot Cascade succeeds in opening the "stardam" enclosing the wormhole and travelling through it to the Andromeda Galaxy. On board Silver Wings of Morning, Hesperus reveals to Campion that while he managed to destroy Cadence before they could leave the Neume star system, Cascade survived and he and Cascade had engaged in a marathon battle, several thousand years. Hesperus was ultimately victorious, but Cascade has fused the ship controls before his defeat and they are past the point of no return.

Campion, now the only shatterling still in pursuit, enters the wormhole after them and emerges in the Andromeda Galaxy, a place apparently devoid of all sentient life. In his search for Purslane and her ship, he travels to a star encased in a huge representation of the Platonic solids, lands on a planet orbiting inside the structure and is greeted by a single, mechanical being, which announces itself to be the last of the First Machines in the Andromeda Galaxy; the others having left (via wormholes) in pursuit of more advanced technology and knowledge. It states that the First Machines have no hostile intent towards the humans, despite what was done to them. Before preparing to depart Andromeda to follow its kin, the First Machine tells Campion that Purslane and Hesperus barely survived the passage into Andromeda. Due to the wormhole's relative youth and instability, Campion arrived over 20,000 years after Silver Wings. After being critically damaged in the wormhole passage, Silver Wings used the last of its energy to travel to the First Machine planet, but had no way of landing. With stasis failing, Hesperus decides to protect Purslane by remodeling himself into a stasis equipped landing pod, sacrificing his personality and memories in the process. Campion is then shown Hesperus, who still contains the still-living Purslane, and the First Machine offers to help him free her before departing.

Reception
Lisa Tuttle, reviewing for The Times, called the novel a "thrilling, mind-boggling adventure" with "visionary brilliance" and a "knock-your-socks-off ending". Zack Handlen of The A.V. Club wrote that Reynolds is particularly adept at conveying the vastness of space and the "inky blackness of the void", adding that House of Suns "keeps up the tradition of forward thinking while improving on the genre’s traditionally flat prose and clumsily drawn women. An immensely thrilling, mind-bending piece of work, House looks to the center of all that emptiness and finds its beating heart".

At SF Signal, one reviewer noted that a "sense of wonder is where this book excels", adding that "Reynolds is playing on a galactic-sized canvas and uses believable science to back up his grand ideas...[t]his yields mind-boggling time scales, where millennia pass by like days".

George Williams, in his review for The Australian, said that "the concepts explored in House of Suns are so far removed from our time, and even from much of the standard fare of science fiction, that parts of the book border on fantasy. The author does carry off a story conceived on a scale rarely seen in science fiction. The weaknesses of the book relate to some old staples of novel writing. While the pace picks up at the end, it starts too slowly and at times the plot meanders. The novel may be filled with rich ideas, but neither of the two leads compels interest and the relationship between them is underdeveloped. It is a pity that these aspects of the book fail to achieve the same heights as the universe in which it is set".

References

2008 British novels
2008 science fiction novels
Fiction set in the Andromeda Galaxy
Novels by Alastair Reynolds
Fiction set in the 7th millennium or beyond
Artificial intelligence in fiction
Fiction about consciousness transfer
Transhumanism in fiction
Artificial wormholes in fiction
Victor Gollancz Ltd books